is a science museum located in Saku, Nagano, Japan. The mission of the museum is "Bringing up of highly creative children through spreading and enlightening them of scientific knowledge".

The architecture and landscape of the museum were designed by Mitsuru Senda and Environment Design Institute.

The museum has a variety of exhibits on earth science, space, biotechnology, and the environment. Some of the attractions that gain the attention of the children are a life-size model of a Brachiosaurus, a 170-seat planetarium with GSS-URANUS (Goto, Inc.) and a display model of the "Mercury" spacecraft presented by NASA.

See also 
 Kimiya Yui (Honorary director)
 City of Saku
 Usuda Star Dome

References

External links 
 Official Web Site 

Aerospace museums in Japan
Science museums in Japan
Planetaria in Japan
Children's museums in Japan
Museums in Nagano Prefecture
Museums established in 2001
2001 establishments in Japan
Saku, Nagano